Fútbol Club La Unión Atlético is a Spanish football team based in La Unión, Murcia, in the Region of Murcia. Founded in 2010 as FC Pinatar Arena, it plays in Tercera División – Group 13, holding home matches at Municipal.

Season to season
 As FC Pinatar Arena 

 As FC La Unión Atlético

4 seasons in Tercera División

References

External links
 

Football clubs in the Region of Murcia
Sports teams in the Region of Murcia
Association football clubs established in 2010
2010 establishments in Spain